The High School Attached to Hunan Normal University, colloquially known in Chinese as '湖南师大附中'(Húnán Shīdà Fùzhōng), is public secondary school located in Yuelu District, Changsha, Hunan Province, China, and is one of the most selective schools in the nation. The competitive admission is mainly based on the score in city-wide or province-wide standardized tests as well as talent in science, music, sports, and the arts.

Founded in 1905 by Yu Zhimo, a leader of the Chinese democratic revolution, the school was initially named ‘Weiyi School’(惟一学堂, literally 'Unique school"). Later, in 1912, it was renamed 'Guang Yi Middle School', which is still valid. Throughout its history, the school's name, as well as its location, has changed several times, mainly due to the Anti-Japanese War and Chinese Civil War. Since September 1984, it has been called 'The High School Attached to Hunan Normal University'.
As its name implies, the school is 'attached to', or 'affiliated with' Normal University, which employs the best college graduates. The school is well known for its top-ranking quality in teaching all over the country. It has produced a lot of notable figures in China, such as former Premier Minister of China, Zhu Rongji and several academicians of the Chinese Academy of Sciences and Chinese Academy of Engineering. The school, along with three other prestigious high schools in Changsha (First High School of Changsha, Changjun High School and Yali School), is recognised as one of the "Famous Four".

History

1905-1927 
The High School Attached to Hunan Normal University was founded on April 12, 1905 by Yu Zhimo, the chairman of Hunan branch of the Chinese United League. Its name used to be 'Wei Yi School' at first, but its founder was under arrest just one year later because of his identity as a vanguard of revolutionary movement. Regarded as an institution of the revolution, the school was forced to close down. The school was not stable until 1911, when the Xinhai Revolution broke out. The local authority then gave the school a lot of support. Consequently, in 1912, there were 700 students on the campus. In 1913, however, the Second Revolution against Yuan Shikai, was a failure and warlords took control of most of the country. Once again, the school had to face directly the threat from the governor because it was teaching students equality and democracy. The school had been nearly abandoned until 1927, when those warlords in China were finally wiped out.

1927-1936 
This period is the golden time of the school.

1936-1949 
After suffering a lot through the wars against Japanese invaders and the Nationalists, the school had almost nothing but ruins of teaching buildings and dormitories in 1945, when Second Sino-Japanese War was eventually over with Japanese army withdrawing from China. Afterwards, the school was renovated and able to open again in March, 1946, with the help from the society. By the end of that year, the number of students in the school had reached 817.
In the following years, Hunan was a theater of the war between the Communism Party and the National Party. During the Chinese Civil War, students from the school were active in the communism movement by waging underground activities. Among them, Yu Yutang, a student from Class 38, was a prominent figure as he sacrificed his precious life. Captured by the Nationalists on September 14, 1949, he refused to tell the enemy any information. Having realized that torture was of no effect, the brutal Nationalists executed the young student on the Mid Autumn Festival that year.

1949-present days 
After the People's Republic of China was founded, the school returned to normal orbit. The Great Proletarian Cultural Revolution, however, ravaged the school and made it impossible to function normally. Like all other education facilities in China, the school was forced to stop classes and let students participate in the class struggle. After the Revolution, everything had to start over, and since then, the school has stepped into a new era full of hope and opportunities. Today, the school is striving to become a second to none high school in China and to raise its name recognition all over the globe.

On May 2, 2015 the school celebrated the 110-year anniversary with a spectacular event, invited principals of other schools around the nation, alumni all over the world.

Notable alumni

In politics
Zhu Rongji - former Premier Minister of People's Republic of China

In media
He Jiong - host
Li Weijia - host
Zhang Yixing - Singer in South Korean band, EXO
Jackson Yee - Member of TFBoys

'Cradle of Gold Medals' 

Since the early 1990s, students from the 'Honor Class of Science' (a class consisting of the most talented students from all over the province) have won 28 gold medals and 9 silver medals in the International Mathematics Olympiad (IMO), International Physics Olympiad (IPhO), International Chemistry Olympiad (IChO), International Biology Olympiad (IBO) and International Environment Olympiad. No other school in China holds such a distinction. The table below shows the detail:

Due to political issues, China has been absent in all International Olympiads held in Taiwan.

Students’ life 

For the majority of senior 1 students, life in the school is easy. They have a bit of time to do what they are interested in. When stepping into senior 2, however, students usually experience, or exaggeratedly, suffer from a faster life due to heavier schoolwork. It is a normal phenomenon in any Chinese senior high school, for students must be well-prepared for the incoming National Higher Education Entrance Examination. Another evidence is that it is the students from senior 1 who mostly make up the Student Union. As for senior 3, it is regarded as the most tiring year that a student is likely to have ever experienced. As a survey revealed, more than 90% students in senior 3 generally feel exhausted, which is a phenomenon existing all over the mainland of China.

Although the students are often busy with their schoolwork, there are four major festivals for developing students as well as helping students release themselves. Besides, instead of organizing the festivals, teachers supervise the members from school's Student Union who are actually in charge of arranging the festivals and coordinating everything. The four festivals are:

1. Art Festival
Since 1985, there has been an Art Festival which usually last for five days in every December. During the Art Festival, every class from the same grade will perform one play in a soiree. All the plays will be graded by judges composed by art teachers, and then a list of winners will come out based on their marks. Traditionally, all the first-prize performances will be played on the last day of the Art Festival once again. This final show, also acted as the closing ceremony, will be watched by all the students and the faculty through TV.

2. Sport Festival
The Sport Festival could be grander than any other festivals in the school. The accurate year of first Sport Festival can not be confirmed, but it did start in a September. The Sport Festival is made up of several separate matches and a track meet. Those matches are also classified by students’ grade. For instance, senior 1 usually has soccer matches, while the tug-of-war always belongs to senior 3 only. The track meet is the climax of the whole Sport Festival, for all the personnel in the school, both students and faculty, are involved. Yet, most games in the track meet are also divided into groups consisting classes from the same grade while the teachers compete together. Compared to other three Festivals, Sport Festival is much more competitive due to its own nature.

3. Science Festival
Every April since 1987, the Science Festival takes place. The Science Festival mainly consist of some lectures given by scientists and professors in colleges as well as some competitive activities like electric circuits designing. There is no doubt that the very purpose of this festival is motivating students to think differently. In the China Adolescents Science Technology Invention Contest, students from the attached school have been performing extremely well, which is partially credited to the Science Festival. What's more, several students have even been exempted from the National Higher Education Entrance Examination due to their remarkable works.

4. Festival of Associations
The Festival of Associations which first started in 2004, is much younger than the other three festivals mentioned above. This festival is most popular one among students, however, for its various forms of activities. Basically, every association at school will hold at least one activity depending on the nature of the association itself. For instance, Basketball Association usually hold basketball games where there is no restriction on the age and the grade of players. Since teachers and students can play in a same team, it provides more possibilities of combination than the Sports Festival does. Ergo, participants fight for honor in the Sport Festival and play for fun in the Festival of Association. Other associations like History Association and Association of Birds Enthusiast, usually hold a series of propaganda campaign about their topics. These include picture shows and/or lectures.

International Cooperation 

The school has already established long-term friendly cooperative relationships with Southpoint Academy in Canada, Xiao Xing High School of Incheon, South Korea, Springvale Secondary College in Australia and Brooke House College in Britain. The High School recently entered into a "sister school" relationship with Orono High School in Orono, Maine, United States.

Every year the High School welcomes many waves of visitors from friend schools. In some long-period program, local students, usually from senior 1 and senior 2, are responsible for the reception task by 'babysitting' his or her partner: a foreign student will randomly be assigned to a Chinese student. More specifically, they will go, eat, sleep and study in parallel. Thus, if students want to apply for the reception mission, they will have to meet the language as well as financial requirement set up by the school first.  Under most circumstances, it is an opportunity for Chinese students to make friends as well as practice English skills. As a result, despite the strict selectivity, passionate students still apply for such opportunities eagerly.

In return, the High School also dispatches delegates, consisting of students as well as teachers, to visit friend schools in hopes of learning their successful experience and improving mutual understanding. All students in the High School are eligible for the application and therefore competition is extremely fierce. Based on the records of previous visits, members of Student Union are much more likely to be selected.

National Cooperation 

For a long time, the school has been sending its best teachers to assist some of its cooperative schools. One notable event occurred in 2008, when the school expanded into Hainan Province by opening up a branch school in Hai Kou. This was a milestone in the history of the school, showing its growing strength. Recently, another junior high school became affiliated with the High School Attached to Hunan Normal University, as a new way to cultivate outstanding junior graduates for the parent-school.

After the 5.12 earthquake, the school has been helping Li County reconstruct its schools and education systems. Besides, the school has established ‘Sichuan Class’ consisting of students from Sichuan who lost their homes and schools in the great quake.

On the first anniversary of the earthquake, May 12, 2009, the school held a large-scale commemoration by standing in silent tribute. In the 'Sichuan Class', a special class meeting was held. Wearing white flowers, students gathered to mourn those compatriots who lost their lives. The headmaster, Liyuan Chang, wrote a letter to express his grief for the victims and hope for the survivors. Some part of it are cited below:

 I believe the earthquake can destroy our hometown, but never defeat our spirit and volition. Our determination to pursue a better life is not crushed as well. 
I believe everyone of you will study hard and practice hard, striving to be pillars of our nation. 
I believe, we study together to draw a better future a few years later.
I believe, our friendship will be sweeter just like a bottle of straveccio.

See also 
Hunan Normal University
Yali School

Notes

External links
Official website of the High School Attached to Hunan Normal University
Chinese Communist Youth League Committee of the High School Attached to Hunan Normal University

High schools in Changsha
Buildings and structures in Changsha
Hunan Normal University
Educational institutions established in 1905
1905 establishments in China